Lisandro Bernadino Trenidad (born 20 May 1991) is a soccer player from Curaçao who plays as a forward for Hubentut Fortuna in the Netherlands Antilles.

Teams
 Hubentut Fortuna

References
Goal.com

1991 births
Living people
Curaçao footballers
Sekshon Pagá players
Association football forwards
Netherlands Antilles international footballers
SV Hubentut Fortuna players